The Curve is a 1998 thriller film starring Matthew Lillard, Keri Russell and Michael Vartan, which premiered at the 1998 Sundance Film Festival under its original title, Dead Man's Curve. It draws on the urban legend that a student will receive only A+ letter grades should their roommate commit suicide (pass by catastrophe).

Plot
After hearing of a school policy granting anyone whose roommate commits suicide an automatic 4.0 GPA, Harvard Med School aspirants Chris (Michael Vartan) and Tim (Matthew Lillard) plot to kill their roommate Rand (Randall Batinkoff) and make it look like a suicide. They're successful, but when the fallout breeds unforeseen consequences and two local detectives close in, guilt and mistrust fester, jeopardizing Chris's relationship with his girlfriend Emma (Keri Russell) and the roommates' futures.

Cast
Matthew Lillard – Tim
Michael Vartan – Chris
Keri Russell – Emma
Randall Batinkoff – Rand
Dana Delany – Dr. Ashley
Tamara Craig Thomas – Natalie
Bo Dietl – Detective Amato
Anthony Griffith – Detective Shipper
Kevin Ruf – Ernie
Kris McGaha – Renee

Production
The Curve was filmed at Elk Neck State Park and Johns Hopkins University in Baltimore, Maryland, and screened at the 1998 Sundance Film Festival as an Official Selection. The film was renamed The Curve after its Sundance premiere to avoid confusion with the film Dead Man on Campus, a comedy with a similar pass by catastrophe premise about two college roommates who try to get another roommate to commit suicide which was released the same year. In the UK and Australia, however, the film was released as Dead Man's Curve.

Reception
The Curve was met with a mostly negative reception. It holds a score of 0% on the review aggregator website Rotten Tomatoes, based on 8 reviews. In a review for Variety, Dennis Harvey commented that "“Curve” bends too low for upscale auds, it’s also problematic for mainstream ones as a near-horror thriller sans onscreen violence (or genuinely surprising plot twists). It will take aggressive marketing to reap quick payoff on a film likely to get just lukewarm critical and word-of-mouth response."

In a more favorable review, William Thomas of Empire rated the film 4/5 stars and stated that it has "boasting originality, an easy-going hipness and a disregard for convention, this represents all that's good about the American indie scene."

Soundtrack 
Prior to the start of filming, writer/director Dan Rosen and score composer Shark made a mixtape of songs they were considering for use in the film, which Rosen gave to the principal actors in The Curve to establish the film's tone. When editor Glenn Garland put together the first edit of the film, he used music from this mix tape as "temp music," and many of the songs ended up in the final film.

A song-based soundtrack album featuring songs from The Curve was released in Japan through Toho Records.

The North American Original Soundtrack album through Chromatic Records featured 14 tracks composed by Shark, an aria from the 1892 opera La Wally and the songs "Die" by Starbelly, "Bela Lugosi's Dead" by Bauhaus and "Wake Up Sad (remix)" by Wild Colonials.

References

External links

1990s thriller films
1998 films
American neo-noir films
Films based on urban legends
American black comedy films
Films shot in Baltimore
Trimark Pictures films
1998 directorial debut films
Films set in universities and colleges
1990s English-language films
1990s American films